Calliactis is a genus of sea anemones. Species in this genus are mutually symbiotic with hermit crabs. The anemone gets a place to live and discarded scraps of the crab's food in exchange for its help in defending the crab.

Species
Species within the genus include:

Calliactis algoaensis
Calliactis androgyna
Calliactis annulata
Calliactis argentacoloratus
Calliactis armillatas 
Calliactis brevicornis
Calliactis conchicola
Calliactis japonica
Calliactis marmorata 
Calliactis parasitica
Calliactis polypores
Calliactis polypus
Calliactis reticulata
Calliactis sinensis
Calliactis tricolor
Calliactis valdiviae
Calliactis variegata
Calliactis xishaensis

References

External links

gsmfc.org (PDF)
marlin.ac.uk
habitas.org.uk
ourworld.compuserve.com

Hormathiidae
Hexacorallia genera